Thompson House, also known as the William Thompson House, is a historic plantation house located near Wake Forest, Wake County, North Carolina.  It was built about 1853, and is a two-story, three-bay Greek Revival-style frame dwelling.  It is sheathed in weatherboard, sits on a fieldstone foundation, and has four brick chimneys, two on each side. Also on the property is a contributing -story barn (c. 1853). The house and barn were moved to its present location in 2004.

It was listed on the National Register of Historic Places in 2005.

References

Plantation houses in North Carolina
Houses on the National Register of Historic Places in North Carolina
Greek Revival houses in North Carolina
Houses completed in 1853
Houses in Wake County, North Carolina
National Register of Historic Places in Wake County, North Carolina